Connor Essam (born 9 July 1992) is an English professional footballer who plays as a defender for Dartford.

Club career

Gillingham
Born in Chatham, Kent, Essam joined Gillingham in January 2002 and progressed through the ranks of the youth team and also captained the side. In March 2010, Essam was awarded his first professional contract along with Dean Rance and Charlie Stimson. He was sent out to Conference South side Bishop's Stortford in October 2010 on an initial one-month loan which was later extended. Later on in the season he joined Dover Athletic on loan in the same division. His contract was extended by a year in May 2011. In August 2011, Essam rejoined Bishop's Stortford of the Conference North on a one-month loan deal along with Dean Rance. He scored his first goal for the club on 29 August in a 5–0 win over Hinckley United. Essam joined Conference South outfit Dartford on loan in December 2011. He scored in the 4–1 away league win over Staines Town. Essam made his professional and Gillingham debut on 13 February 2012 in a 2–1 home defeat to Southend United. On 31 August 2012 Essam signed for Luton Town on a month-long loan, later extended for a second month. He returned to Gillingham on 2 November after making nine appearances for Luton, and was swiftly made available on a free transfer by Gillingham manager, Martin Allen.

Crawley Town

On 23 January 2013, Essam signed for Crawley Town of Football League One on a free transfer, with Gillingham retaining an interest by inserting a sell-on clause into the contract. In November 2013, Essam joined Conference Premier side Dartford on a one-month loan deal. Shortly into the 2013–14 season, he was released.

Dover Athletic 
On 1 September 2014, Essam signed for Dover Athletic, on the same day as he was released by Crawley Town.

Leyton Orient

On 27 July 2015, it was announced that Essam signed for Football League Two side Leyton Orient on a one-year contract following a successful trial, despite Orient having not agreed to a transfer fee with Dover. A transfer fee was agreed between the sides the following week.

In March 2016, he returned to Dover Athletic on loan until the end of the season.

In May 2016, he was released from Leyton Orient when it was announced that he would not be retained when his contract expired.

Eastleigh

On 14 June 2016, Essam joined National League side Eastleigh on a one-year deal. After only making five appearances in the space of a month, Essam joined Woking on a 93-day loan. Two days later, Essam made his Woking debut in a 1–1 draw against Guiseley, playing the full 90 minutes. However, just after a month into his loan spell with Woking, Essam was recalled by Eastleigh to cover an injury crisis. After a short spell back at Eastleigh, Essam once again left the club on loan, this time returning to Dover Athletic on a deal for the remainder of the campaign. Following a successful loan spell back at Dover, it was announced that Essam would leave Eastleigh in June 2017 upon the expiry of his current deal.

Dover Athletic

On 20 June 2017, Essam joined Dover Athletic, returning to the Whites on a two-year deal. He made his debut on the opening day in a 1–0 away victory to Hartlepool United.

In November 2018, he joined Concord Rangers on loan until the end of the season.

Hemel Hempstead Town
Essam joined National League South team Hemel Hempstead Town in the summer of 2019.

Dartford
On 16 August 2020, Essam was announced to have joined Dartford.

Career statistics

Honours
Dartford
Kent Senior Cup: 2019–20, 2021–22

References

External links

1992 births
Living people
Sportspeople from Chatham, Kent
Footballers from Kent
English footballers
Association football defenders
Gillingham F.C. players
Bishop's Stortford F.C. players
Dover Athletic F.C. players
Dartford F.C. players
Eastleigh F.C. players
Luton Town F.C. players
Crawley Town F.C. players
Leyton Orient F.C. players
Woking F.C. players
Concord Rangers F.C. players
Hemel Hempstead Town F.C. players
National League (English football) players
English Football League players